The Appin Murder was the assassination of Colin Roy Campbell, the Clan Campbell tacksman of Glenure, on 14 May 1752 near Appin in the west of Scotland. The murder occurred in the aftermath of the Jacobite Rising of 1745 and led to the execution of James Stewart of the Glens, often characterized as a notorious miscarriage of justice. The murder inspired events in Robert Louis Stevenson's 1886 novel Kidnapped.

Victim

Colin Roy Campbell of Glenure (1708-1752), nicknamed "The Red Fox", was the government-appointed factor to the forfeited lands of the Clan Stewart of Appin in north Argyllshire. During the Highland Clearances, a series of reprisals against Jacobite sympathizers in the aftermath of the rising of 1745, Campbell had ordered several evictions of members of Clan Stewart. On 14 May 1752, Campbell was shot in the back by a marksman in the wood of Lettermore near Duror.

Shortly before his murder, Colin Roy Campbell was mentioned by Jacobite poet Alasdair MacMhaighstir Alasdair in his Anti-Whig satire An Airce. In the poem, the ghost of a beheaded Jacobite who prophesies that his Campbell clansmen will soon be punished for committing high treason against their lawful king. Colin is one of the few Whigs for whom the ghost confesses a certain respect:

Trial
The search for the killer targeted the Clan Stewart. The chief suspect, Alan Breck Stewart having fled, James Stewart of the Glens, the tanist of the Stewarts, was arrested for the crime and tried for the murder in a trial dominated by the pro-Hanoverian Clan Campbell: the chief Archibald Campbell, 3rd Duke of Argyll was the presiding judge and the 15-man jury contained Campbell clansmen. Although the trial showed that James was not directly involved in the assassination (he had a solid alibi), he was found guilty "in airts and pairts" (as an accessory; or an aider and abetter).

James Stewart was hanged on 8 November 1752 on a specially commissioned gibbet above the narrows at Ballachulish, now near the south entrance to the Ballachulish Bridge. He died protesting his innocence, lamenting that people of the ages may think him capable of a horrid and barbarous murder. Before mounting the scaffold, he sang the Metrical version of the 35th Psalm in Scottish Gaelic:

To this day in the Highlands, it remains known as "The Psalm of James of the Glens".

James of the Glens' corpse was left hanging at the south end of the Ballachulish Ferry for eighteen months as a warning to other Clans with rebellious intentions. Over those months, it was beaten and battered by winds and rain. As it deteriorated, the skeletal remains were held together with chains and wire.

Recent scholarship

In Walking With Murder: On The Kidnapped Trail (2005), Ian Nimmo has addressed the mystery of who shot Colin Campbell, applying modern police methods to the documents in the case, including two post-mortem reports.  According to Nimmo, Alan Stewart did not pull the trigger, and the secret of who did has been handed down through the Stewart family for 250 years. Nimmo chose not to reveal it, stating that "it is not mine to give away".

In 2001, Anda Penman, an 89-year-old descendant of the Clan Chiefs of the Stewarts of Appin, alleged the murder had been planned by four young Stewart tacksmen without the sanction of James of the Glens. There was a shooting contest among them and the assassination was committed by the best marksman among the four, Donald Stewart of Ballachulish. According to some accounts, Donald desperately wanted to turn himself in rather than allow James to hang and had to be physically held down to prevent this. Several years after James's execution, when the body was finally delivered to the Stewart Clan for burial, Donald Stewart of Ballachulish was responsible for washing the bones before the funeral.

In his 2004 examination of the evidence, Lee Holcombe also concluded that Donald Stewart, rather than Allan Breck Stewart, was probably the actual shooter. However, he also concluded that James of the Glens was indeed guilty of ordering the murder of Colin Campbell.

Recent legal developments

There is a movement afoot to gain a pardon for James of the Glens. In 2008, Glasgow lawyer John Macaulay asked the Scottish Criminal Cases Review Commission to reconsider the case on the grounds his study of the trial transcripts shows there was "not a shred of evidence" against Stewart. but was denied due to the case being so old it was not in the interest of justice. As of 2010, the application lies with the Scottish government.

Notes

References

 (backup site (page 5))

Further reading

See also
William Grant, Lord Prestongrange the chief prosecutor.
Keppoch murders

External links

Lyrics to "The Red Fox" (Big Country song about the murder) (Archived 25 October 2009)

1752 in Scotland
History of the Scottish Highlands
Lochaber
Murder in Scotland
Political scandals in Scotland
Unsolved murders in Scotland